Talasius  is also known as Thalasius, Talassus and Talassio is a god of marriage in Roman mythology. His equivalent in Greek mythology is Hymen. His name was called out during marriages. The name was derived from Thalasus, which means "wool-basket". Later accounts state that he is friend of Romulus, and that he played a role in the rape of the Sabine women.

References

Sources
 Catullus, 61, 134.
 Livy. History of Rome i, 9.12.
 Plurarch. Quaestiones Romanae, 31.

Marriage deities
Roman gods
Mythological rapists
Marriage in ancient Rome